Judy Holdener (née Newhauser) is an American mathematician and educator. She is a professor of mathematics at Kenyon College. She was born in 1965. Holdener's primary interest is in number theory. She discovered a simpler proof of the theorem of Touchard, which states that every perfect number is of the form 2k, 12k+1, or 36k+9.

Holdener earned her B.S. in mathematics at Kent State University and her M.S. and Ph.D. in mathematics at the University of Illinois at Urbana-Champaign. Holdener joined the faculty of Kenyon College in 1997, where she is currently the John B. McCoy Distinguished Teaching Chair.

The poem Euler's Daughter by award-winning South African poet Athol Williams is dedicated to Holdener in celebration of her love of mathematics and life.

References

.
.

External links
Biography Page at Kenyon College

Number theorists
20th-century American mathematicians
21st-century American mathematicians
American women mathematicians
Kent State University alumni
University of Illinois alumni
Kenyon College faculty
Living people
1965 births
20th-century women mathematicians
21st-century women mathematicians
20th-century American women
21st-century American women